Lophopilio is a genus of harvestmen in the family Phalangiidae.

It can be found in countries across Europe, including: Belgium, Denmark, France, Germany, the UK, Latvia, the Netherlands, southern Sweden and in the east of the Crimean Peninsula. It has also been spotted further south in Bulgaria, Montenegro and Bosnia-Herzegovina.

Species
 Lophopilio ephippiata (Hadzi, 1973)
 Lophopilio palpinalis (Herbst, 1799)

References

Harvestmen
Harvestman genera